August Lehmann (26 January 1909 in Zurich– 13 September 1973) was a Swiss footballer who played for Switzerland in the 1938 FIFA World Cup. He also played for FC Zürich, FC Lausanne-Sport, Grasshopper Club Zürich, and FC St. Gallen. A part-time professional, he also worked a night job as a dance band-leader in a Zurich hotel. He outplayed Stanley Matthews in a 2–1 win over England in 1938.

References

External links
Profile at FIFA.com

1909 births
1973 deaths
Swiss men's footballers
Switzerland international footballers
1938 FIFA World Cup players
Association football defenders
FC Zürich players
FC Lausanne-Sport players
Grasshopper Club Zürich players
FC St. Gallen players
Footballers from Zürich